Bogaerts International School is an internationally minded, family-oriented K-12 school located in Uccle. This area is classed as semi-urban, and has a natural green area. The school is located at the doorstep of Brussels, but the campus itself is a wooded area. The school offers an education to both local Belgian families and families from the world over.

Stemming from Bogaerts Education, founded in 1970 by Yann Bogaerts, B.I.S. is the only IB Continuum World School in Brussels, offering a continuum of three programmes of education: the Primary Years Programme (PYP), Middle Years Programme (MYP) and Diploma Programme (DP).

History

BIS got its first authorization by the Belgian programme in 2012 to offer the IB Middle Years Program for Grades 6 to 10. The following year, BIS was authorized by the IB to offer the IB Diploma Program for grades Primary Years Programme 1 to Diploma Programme 2. In the year 2021, BIS was authorized by the IB to offer the Belgian programme for Grades Pre-primary up till year 5, thus becoming the only fully accredited IB school in Brussels.

Premise
The school is situated on the Domaine Latour de Freins in Brussels. The building was designed by the architect Henri Parquet and inaugurated in the presence of King Leopold II in 1903.  The W shaped building takes full advantage of the available sunlight and the Flemish neo-renaissance shape, typical for the period, allies brick masonry with white and blue stone bonds, and a natural slated roofing. The property comprises a wooded park with a surface area of 62,800,000m2. The school consists of a large parking area, an outdoor tennis court, a backyard play area, an indoor gymnasium and a large indoor cafeteria. Currently, the school also hosts students in its boarding facility located within the campus.

Academics
Currently, B.I.S. is the only fully accredited IB world school in Brussels, offering a continuum of three programmes of education: IB Primary Years Programme (PYP), IB Middle Years Programme (MYP) and the IB Diploma Programme (DP). B.I.S. also offers an early years programme which is a part of the PYP for the tiny tots aged between 3 and 6 years.

Besides the IB programme the school also offers language courses from beginner to advanced levels for students in languages like French, Spanish, Italian, Chinese.

Sports & Extra-curricular Activities
B.I.S. offers sports and extra-curricular activities like music, hip-hop dance, kitchen cooking, tennis, classes to enhance logical and critical thinking through robotics, boxing classes, coding classes etc. to name a few.

References

International schools in Brussels
Secondary schools in Brussels
Cambridge schools in Belgium
International Baccalaureate schools in Belgium
Educational institutions established in 2011
2011 establishments in Belgium